Army Knowledge Online (AKO)  provides web-based enterprise information services to the United States Army, joint, and Department of Defense customers. Enterprise services are provided to these customers on both classified and unclassified networks, and include portal, e-mail, directory, discovery, and single sign-on functionality.  All members of the Active Duty, National Guard, Reserves, Army civilian, and select contractor workforce have an account which grants access to Army web assets, tools and services worldwide.  All users can build pages, create file storage areas, and create and participate in discussion on the portal.  AKO provides the Army with a single entry point for access to the Internet and the sharing of knowledge and information, making AKO the Army's only enterprise collaboration tool operating throughout the Department of the Army (DA) worldwide. AKO has been deemed "the world's largest intranet."  One of every two deployed Soldiers accesses the portal daily for mission and personal purposes, and in 2008 AKO recorded its one-billionth login. AKO has also been expanded to the broader DoD community through Defense Knowledge Online, essentially just a rebranding.

AKO is an integrated suite of a number of commercial-off-the-shelf products including the Appian Business Process Management (BPM) Suite technology.  Appian provides the foundation for all information dissemination, knowledge sharing, process management and collaboration across AKO. Users can build custom access control lists for each piece of content they own to determine the audience allowed to see or use their content.  AKO currently has 2.3 million registered users, and supports over 350K users logging in up to a million times a day as well as receiving and delivering on average 12 million emails daily.

History and development

AKO was established in the late 1990s as an experimental outgrowth of a project of the General Office Management Office.  This early project led to A2OL (America's Army Online), but legal concerns over this name and the parallelism to other commercial vendors caused the Army Project team to seek a new name.  Early Project Officers for AKO were charged to develop, research and expand the portal to benefit Army Users Worldwide and to grow the system from its less than auspicious roots.   The project has run through various incarnations and later project leaders, but still the fundamentals of this system apply: centralized name spacing of email (with webmail access), white pages, unification of data conduits, central capability of authentication and repudiation of credentials and the ability to remotely access content.

Users

As of October 2010, all active duty, reserves, and national guard soldiers are required to register an account on AKO.  There are two different types of accounts on Army Knowledge Online, a full account and a guest account.  Authorized full accounts do not require any sponsorship to register, and include the following:
 Active Army
 Army Reserve
 Army Retired
 Contracted ROTC Cadets
 DA Civilian
 Future Soldiers
 Medical Retired
 NAF Civilian
 National Guard
 US Military Academy Cadets

Unlike a full account, guest accounts require an Army sponsor with an authorized full account. Guest accounts include the following:
 Army Volunteer
 Contractor
 Federal Civilian Agencies
 Foreign Officer (attached to U.S Army)
 Homeland Security
 Incoming DA Civilian
 Incoming Future Soldier
 Local National Employee
 Medical Discharge
 Military Transition
 ROTC Cadets (MS I and II)

Features and functionality

A primary function of Army Knowledge Online is its web-based e-mail and collaboration capabilities.  The process capabilities of AKO's underlying technology have been rolled out to AKO organizations for the development and delivery of Business Process Management applications.  One example of an AKO BPM application is "Wounded Warrior," a case management software for the diagnosis and rehabilitation of soldiers wounded in the field.

AKO's Training function allows soldiers and DA (Department of Army) civilians to access Army online education such as Army e-learning Program, Army Learning Management System, Army Correspondence Course Program, Army transcript, US Army Reserve Virtual University, etc. These learning programs allow soldiers and DA civilians opportunities to enrich their educations, such as business courses which are free of charge. These courses can help soldiers with promotion points, and also later be transferred into college credits.

AKO's Finance function allows soldiers to access their financial records, including Leave and Earning Statement, Housing allowances, Food allowances, etc.   AKO's Medical function has soldiers medical records, including DNA, past physical exam, and status of deployment readiness.  There are many other functions as well, including as legal, travel, benefits, family, forms, readiness, and references.

Access and security

Registering for an AKO account is mandatory upon enlistment in the Army. AKO access follows DoD security policy, and is accomplished by password or by a combination of a Common Access Card (CAC) and PIN.  The requirements for an AKO password are stringent; a password must contain at least two uppercase letters, two lowercase letters, two numbers, and two special characters. Passwords expire every 150 days, and may not be replaced by any password used the previous ten times.  As of this time, 8 April 2015, AKO can no longer be accessed without the use of a military CAC card or a DoD-approved PIV.

Criticism

The AKO system has received some substantial criticism with regards to its speed, various areas of functionality, complex security requirements, effectiveness, and compatibility with web browsers, particularly from its daily users.  Many instead choose to use alternatives such as SharePoint and Gmail where they can, although higher ups maintain that its cumbersomeness is a necessary result of securing all its information.  Certain required functionality however, is available only within the AKO system.

References

Category

United States Army organization
Military-themed websites